Siberia Airlines Flight 1812 was a commercial flight shot down by the Ukrainian Air Force over the Black Sea on 4 October 2001, en route from Tel Aviv, Israel to Novosibirsk, Russia. The aircraft, a Soviet-made Tupolev Tu-154, carried 66 passengers and 12 crew members. Most of the passengers were Israelis visiting relatives in Russia. There were no survivors. The crash site is about 190 km west-southwest of the Black Sea resort of Sochi, 140 km north of the Turkish coastal town of Fatsa and 350 km south-southeast of Feodosiya in Crimea. The accident resulted from combat-missile launches during joint Ukrainian-Russian military air-defence exercises. The exercises were held at the Russian-controlled training ground of the 31st Russian Black Sea Fleet Research center on Cape Opuk near the city of Kerch in Crimea. Ukraine eventually admitted that it might have caused the crash, probably by an errant S-200 missile fired by its armed forces. Ukraine paid $15 million to surviving family members of the 78 victims ($200,000 per victim).

History 
Flight 1812 departed Tel Aviv with a destination of Novosibirsk. Soon afterward, the pilot of an Armenian plane crossing the sea nearby reported seeing the Russian plane explode before it crashed into the sea at about 13:45 Moscow time (09:45 GMT). Most of the passengers were Israelis visiting their relatives in Russia. No one on board survived. A national day of mourning was instituted in Israel with a moment of silence, flags at half-mast and schools teaching special lessons on the tragedy. A monument to the victims was built in Ben Shemen forest in Israel.

Occurring less than a month after the September 11 attacks in the United States, the crash was initially suspected by Russian officials to be an act of terrorism, and they denied American reports that it was caused by an S-200 missile.
Later, the Moscow-based Interstate Aviation Committee ruled that the crash was caused by an accidental Ukrainian S-200 missile strike during military training exercises staged off Cape Opuk in Crimea.

Initial private assessments by American military officials determined that the crash was caused by a S-200 missile that had overshot its target drone—which had been destroyed successfully by an S-300 fired at the same time—and instead of self-destructing, locked on the passenger plane about  further away and detonated  over the plane.

Russian officials dismissed the American claim as "unworthy of attention," and Russian president Vladimir Putin told the press the next day that "the weapons used in those exercises had such characteristics that make it impossible for them to reach the air corridor through which the plane was moving." Ukrainian military officials initially denied that their missile had brought down the plane; they reported that the S-200 had been launched seaward and had successfully self-destructed. Defense ministry spokesman Konstantin Khivrenko noted that "neither the direction nor the range (of the missiles) correspond to the practical or theoretical point at which the plane exploded."

However, some Ukrainian officials later admitted that their military had probably shot down the airliner. Ukrainian officials speculated that water interference caused the missile to veer off course. Ukraine reportedly banned the testing of Buk, S-300 and similar missile systems for a period of seven years following this incident.

Compensation payments

Israeli citizens 
On 20 November 2003, an ex gratia compensation agreement was signed between the governments of Ukraine and Israel. It was later ratified by the relatives of the victims. In addition to compensation issues, the agreement stated that "Ukraine is not legally responsible for the accident that occurred to the plane and free of any obligations regarding it." Commenting on the agreement, Gen. Oleksandr Kuz'muk, the former minister of defense who lost his job after the accident, told media that "the payments were a humane action, not the admission of guilt."

Russian citizens 
Ukraine agreed to pay the families of each of the 38 Russian victims the sum of $200,000, the same amount that it had paid to the families of the 40 Israeli victims. The settlement was ratified by the Russian parliament in May 2004 and President Vladimir Putin signed it into law in June 2004.

Additional compensation claims

Pechersk local court 
Some relatives of the crash victims refused to accept the compensation offered by Ukraine. They brought a civil suit against the Ukrainian government to Pechers'ky local court in Kyiv. During the court hearings, Ministry of Defence of Ukraine representatives stated that the airplane "could not be brought down by a Ukrainian missile" according to the forensic examination of the plane's debris, radar information and technical capabilities of the missiles. They also argued that the Soviet-made identification friend or foe system of the missile in question would have prevented it from striking the Soviet-made airliner. The lawyer representing the plaintiffs argued that the fault of the Ukrainian government was effectively proven by the fact that it had negotiated the compensations for relatives of the Israeli victims.

Appeals in courts 
On 22 August 2007, a Kyiv appeals court dismissed the victims' relatives' suit against the defence ministry, ruling that military of Ukraine bore no liability for the accident. The court decision conflicts with report of the IAC group that had investigated the accident on Russia's behalf.

Siberian Airlines lawsuit 
Between 2003 and 2005, the Ukrainian government paid $15.6 million in compensation to the relatives of the victims. In 2004, Siberian Airlines filed a lawsuit against the Ministry of Defence of Ukraine and the Ukraine State Treasury at a Kyiv court, seeking more than $15.3 million in compensation for the loss of the jet. However, in September 2011 the Kyiv Interregional Commercial Court of Appeal rejected a compensation claim from Siberian Airlines. An appeal to Kyiv's Economic Court of Appeals was rejected in May 2012. The ruling was further upheld in December 2012 by Ukraine's Supreme Commercial Court.
, the court proceedings continued, but they were disrupted by the Maidan protests.

Memorial services 
Memorial services were held in Israel, Sochi and Novosibirsk.

See also 
 Itavia Flight 870
 Iran Air Flight 655
 Israel–Russia relations
 Israel–Ukraine relations
 Korean Air Lines Flight 007
 List of airliner shootdown incidents
 Korean Air Lines Flight 902
 Malaysia Airlines Flight 17
 Ukraine International Airlines Flight 752
 2003 Baghdad DHL attempted shootdown incident
 Russia–Ukraine relations

References

External links 
  Investigation. Interstate Aviation Committee.

Canadian TV  reporting on the unscheduled stopover at Burgas, Bulgaria.

Airliner shootdown incidents
Aviation accidents and incidents in 2001
Aviation accidents and incidents in Turkey
Accidents and incidents involving the Tupolev Tu-154
2001 in Turkey
2001 in Ukraine
2001 disasters in Russia
History of the Black Sea
Aviation accidents and incidents in Ukraine
Aviation accidents and incidents in international airspace
Ukrainian Air Force
Aviation accidents and incidents in Russia
2001 controversies
October 2001 events in Europe
October 2001 events in Ukraine
Israel–Russia relations
Israel–Ukraine relations
Russia–Ukraine relations
October 2001 events in Russia
21st-century aircraft shootdown incidents
Disasters in Crimea
2001 disasters in Ukraine
Black Sea